Petregino is a rural locality (a village) in Pakshengskoye Rural Settlement of Velsky District, Arkhangelsk Oblast, Russia. The population was 10 as of 2014. There is 1 street.

Geography 
Petregino is located 39 km north of Velsk (the district's administrative centre) by road. Kulakovo-Podgorye is the nearest rural locality.

References 

Rural localities in Velsky District